Wilfred Frederick Frank Price (25 April 1902 – 13 January 1969) was a cricketer who played for Middlesex County Cricket Club from 1926 to 1947. Price also stood as an umpire from 1950 to 1967. He played in one Test match and officiated as an umpire in eight.

Price was a wicket-keeper who took 648 catches and 316 stumpings in his first-class career. He was named as one of the Wisden Cricketers of the Year in 1940.

Price was unfortunate to be around in the same era as Les Ames, which limited Price's opportunities for an international career. He toured abroad twice, once with the Honourable Freddie Calthorpe's side in 1929/30, when he went as a replacement for Rony Stanyforth, and then on a non-Test tour to South America in 1937/8.

Price's reputation as an umpire was as someone who would stand up strongly for what he felt was right. He once no-balled Tony Lock, the Surrey and England spin bowler for throwing against India. He also lay down at square-leg, refusing to get up, to stop barracking at a Surrey-Yorkshire game.

References

Wisden obituary

1902 births
1969 deaths
English Test cricket umpires
England Test cricketers
English cricketers
London Counties cricketers
Middlesex cricketers
Wisden Cricketers of the Year
Players cricketers
Marylebone Cricket Club cricketers
English cricketers of 1919 to 1945
North v South cricketers
Sir T. E. W. Brinckman's XI cricketers